Accounting is one of several academic events sanctioned by the University Interscholastic League.  The contest began in the 1986-87 scholastic year. Accounting is designed to test students' understanding of general accounting principles and practices used in the business environment.

Eligibility
Students in Grade 9 through Grade 12 are eligible to enter this event.  All grades compete in one division, but are divided into classifications as determined by school enrollment (As with all University Interscholastic League competitions).

The test covers elementary principles and practices of accounting for sole proprietorships, partnerships, and corporations, and may include bookkeeping terminology, the worksheet with adjustments, income statement, balance sheet, trial balance, account classification, journalizing, posting, bank reconciliation, payroll, and other items related to the basic accounting cycle.

Each school may send up to four students; however, in districts with more than eight schools the district executive committee can limit participation to three students per school.  In order for a school to participate in team competition, the school must send at least three students.

Rules and Scoring
The test consists of 80 questions, which must be completed in one hour.  A time signal is given at 55 minutes warning students that only five minutes remain; at the end of the hour the students must immediately stop writing.

The questions may be answered in any order; there is no penalty for skipping questions.

Students are allowed to use scratch paper and highlighter pens during the contest.  Calculators are also allowed during the contest, provided the following criteria are met:
The calculators must be basic "four-function" models, though simple functions such as percent, square root, and simple memory are allowed.  Higher-level business, financial, statistical, graphing, and scientific calculators are not permitted.
The calculators must be hand-held, operate silently, not be equipped with a tape output, and be able to operate without requiring external power (rechargeable batteries are permitted but they must be charged prior to competition).
All memory must be cleared prior to the contest.

Exact answers are required on all questions.

Five points are awarded for each correct answer, no points are deducted for wrong or unanswered problems.  In addition, any of the 20 starred questions answered correctly receive one bonus point for each star (e.g., a two-star question answered correctly is worth 7 points, 5 base points for the correct answer plus one point for each star). The highest possible score on any test is a 420.

Determining the Winner
The top three individuals and the top team (determined based on the scores of the top three individuals) will advance to the next round.  In addition, within each region, the highest-scoring second place team from all district competitions advances as the "wild card" to regional competition (provided the team has four members), and within the state, the highest-scoring second place team from all regional competitions advances as the wild card to the state competition.  Members of advancing teams who did not place individually remain eligible to compete for individual awards at higher levels.

There is no tiebreaker in individual competition; all tied individuals will advance.

For team competition, the score of the fourth-place individual is used as the tiebreaker.  If a team has only three members it is not eligible to participate in the tiebreaker.  If the fourth-place score still results in a tie, the individual tiebreaker rules will not apply, and all remaining tied teams will advance.  At the state level ties for first place are not broken.

For district, regional, and state meet academic championship and sweepstakes awards, points are awarded to the school as follows:
Individual places: 1st--15, 2nd--12, 3rd--10, 4th--8, 5th--6, and 6th--4.
Team places: 1st--10 and 2nd--5.
The maximum number of points a school can earn in Accounting is 55.

List of prior winners

Individual
NOTE: For privacy reasons, only the winning school is shown. 

NOTE: UIL Reclassification happened in 2015, adding the 6A classification.

Team
NOTE: UIL did not recognize a team championship in this event until the 1992-93 scholastic year. 

NOTE: UIL Reclassification happened in 2015, adding the 6A classification.

NOTE: Highest score across all classification shown in bold.

References

External links
 Official UIL Rules for Accounting

University Interscholastic League